The Wades Lane Formation is a geologic formation in New Brunswick. It preserves fossils dating back to the Cambrian period.

See also

 List of fossiliferous stratigraphic units in New Brunswick

References
 

Cambrian New Brunswick
Cambrian south paleopolar deposits